Invalidní sourozenci (The Invalid Siblings) is a Czech science fiction novel by Egon Bondy. It was first published in 1974.

References

1974 Czech novels
1974 science fiction novels